Nowshera Cantonment is a cantonment adjacent to Nowshera in Khyber Pakhtunkhwa, Pakistan, located on the opposite bank of the Kabul River.

External links
Nowshera Cantonment; globalsecurity.org
  

Nowshera District
Cantonments of Pakistan